Super Swing Golf: Season 2 (Super Swing Golf in Europe, and Swing Golf PangYa 2nd Shot!! in Japan) is a golf video game developed and published by Tecmo for the Wii. It was released in the North America on December 11, 2007. It is the sequel to Super Swing Golf, and both are based on the Korean free online multiplayer golf game, PangYa.

Gameplay
Super Swing Golf: Season 2 includes an improved story mode, with an overworld map that does not necessarily follow events in a set order. On top of the multiplayer Stroke Play, Match Play and Balloon Pop games that came with the first game, two new multiplayer games were added to the party mode. The game has largely remained the same beyond these changes, the addition of new courses, and various cosmetic tweaks.

The game has two different control schemes; either using the Swing control scheme with the Wii Remote used as though it were a golf club, or using the Button control scheme which is similar to the Mario Golf-style of control scheme.

Reception

The game was met with average reception upon release; GameRankings gave it a score of 71.69%, while Metacritic gave it 70 out of 100.

GameSpy gave the game two-and-a-half stars out of five, criticizing the game for being more of an expansion pack over the first game than a true sequel. 1UP.com gave the game a B−, reporting that the game has surprising depth that can be off-putting to those just looking to have a good time. IGN handed out a score of 7.3 out of 10, and reported that despite just adding incremental improvements over the previous installments, "Super Swing Golf: Season 2 is still the best overall golf experience you can find on Wii." GameSpot gave the game seven out of ten, calling it a good golf game, despite the minimal improvements over its predecessor.

References

External links

2007 video games
Golf video games
Tecmo games
Video game sequels
Video games developed in Japan
Wii-only games
Wii games
Rising Star Games games
Multiplayer and single-player video games